Ceredigion is a large rural county in West Wales. It has a long coastline of Cardigan Bay to the west and the remote moorland of the Cambrian Mountains in the east, with the mountainous terrain of Plynlimon in the northeast. Ceredigion has a total of 264 scheduled monuments, which is too many for a single list page. For convenience the list is divided into two, the 163 prehistoric sites and the 101 sites from Roman to modern dates (shown below). Included on this page are 4 Roman military sites, 7 early Medieval sites, all inscribed or carved stones. The 39 high Medieval sites are overwhelmingly defensive settlements: everything from castles, mottes and ringworks to enclosures and deserted house sites. The notable exception is the abbey ruins at Strata Florida. From the post-medieval period, there are 17 deserted settlements, 5 bridges, 9 lead mines, 6 field defenses from World War II, and an assortment of other sites - a total of 51 post-medieval monuments. Ceredigion is both a unitary authority and a historic county. Historically the county was called Cardiganshire. Between 1974 and 1996 it was merged with Carmarthenshire and Pembrokeshire to form Dyfed.

All the pre-Roman sites are listed at List of Scheduled prehistoric Monuments in Ceredigion

Scheduled monuments (SAMs) have statutory protection. It is illegal to disturb the ground surface or any standing remains. The compilation of the list is undertaken by Cadw Welsh Historic Monuments, which is an executive agency of the National Assembly of Wales. The list of scheduled monuments below is supplied by Cadw with additional material from RCAHMW and Dyfed Archaeological Trust.

Roman to modern scheduled monuments in Ceredigion

See also
List of Cadw properties
List of castles in Wales
List of hill forts in Wales
Historic houses in Wales
List of monastic houses in Wales
List of museums in Wales
List of Roman villas in Wales

References
Coflein is the online database of RCAHMW: Royal Commission on the Ancient and Historical Monuments of Wales, DAT is the Dyfed Archaeological Trust, Cadw is the Welsh Historic Monuments Agency

Ceredigion
Buildings and structures in Ceredigion